Skellefteå is an album by Swedish band The Wannadies, named after the band's home town Skellefteå in northern Sweden.

A compilation of the best of their releases for MNW Records/Soap, the album also features the previously unreleased track, "Easier To Sing", and was released in 1998.

Track listing

References

External links
Official Wannadies website

The Wannadies albums
1998 compilation albums